Rob Schiller is an American television director and producer.

Since 1984, Schiller has amassed a number of directorial credits namely A Different World, Ned and Stacey, Living Single, Ellen, Malcolm & Eddie, The King of Queens, Two and a Half Men, 'Til Death, Anger Management, $#*! My Dad Says and other television series.

In 1990 and 1991, Schiller won a Daytime Emmy Award for Outstanding Drama Series Directing Team for directing soap opera Santa Barbara.

In 2010, Schiller directed the stage play Greater Tuna at Boulder's Dinner Theatre in Boulder, Colorado.

In 2011, Schiller's first feature film, And They're Off was released.

References

External links
Official website (archived)

 Director Rob Schiller- And They're Off Review via LA Times
 Rob Schiller Increases Commitment to Philanthropic Activities via Business Wire
 Rob Schiller, President of R&B Jaamz, Inc. Supports Homeless Woman And Their Infants In Los Angeles
 R&B Jaamz, Inc. Rob Schiller Serves As Mentor And Educator For Young Filmmakers
 Rob Schiller Increases Commitment to Philanthropic Activities
 Director Rob Schiller Supports Children at Brad Garrett's Annual Celebrity Poker Tournament
 Director Rob Schiller Takes Part in Santa Monica Charity Poker Tournament
 Hollywood Director Rob Schiller Continues Supporting Children's Rights
'Wendell&Vinnie' Director Rob Schiller Supports the Boys and Girls Clubs of Santa Monica
 Director Rob Schiller Teams Up With Warner Theater
'Happily Divorced'Director Rob Schiller Gives Back to LA's Less Fortunate
'Wendell & Vinnie' Director Rob Schiller Joins Jason Alexander For Annual Celebrity Poker Tournament Benefiting weSPARK

American television directors
American television producers
American theatre directors
Daytime Emmy Award winners
Living people
Place of birth missing (living people)
Year of birth missing (living people)